Ballincollig GAA is a Gaelic football and hurling club based in the town of Ballincollig, County Cork, Ireland. The club is affiliated with the Cork GAA board and plays in the Muskerry divisional competitions. In 2009, the club will participate in the Cork Senior Football Championship and the Cork Intermediate Hurling Championship.

History

The GAA itself was founded in 1884 and the first Cork County Board was formed in 1886 with 21 teams from across the county. Ballincollig were in this initial 21, however it was not until 1887 that the first record of entry into the Championship from a team from Carrigrohane, with a late submission. With a lot of upheaval in the early days of the board, there were rival boards formed and in 1891 the club entered a team under the name of Ballincollig Gladstonians. It wasn't until 1895 that the Ballincollig recorded its first significant victory in the Bride Valley Tournament by defeating the Barrs. In 1903 the club as well as the town fell into decline with the closure of the gunpowder mills. 1909 saw a huge revival with the arrival of new Parish Priest Fr Dan O'Donovan and the starting up of the Mid Cork Leagues. 1919 saw the adoption of today's club colours, green and white and it wasn't until 1927 that the club introduced a football team at any level. 1939 saw Ballincollig win the Intermediate Hurling Championship and were then regraded to senior status. In 1942, the club was the first team in nine years to defeat Glen Rovers in the Cork Senior Hurling Championship. In the period from 1941 to 1943, the club came very close to winning the Senior Hurling title. In 1943, a dubious free almost 9 minutes into added time cost the clubvictory over a great St Finbarr's side. After being outclassed in the previous two finals by Glen Rovers and St Finbarr's, Ballincollig had delivered their greatest ever senior display, only to be held to a draw in controversial circumstances. In the replay, they were unable to get over the sense of injustice from the drawn game, and they capitulated easily.

In 2009, the club won their first ever Cork Under-21 Football Championship atoning for their defeat 13 years previously. Hot favourites and reigning county champions St Finbarr's were dethroned. Despite hitting 18 wides, performances by Ciaran O'Sullivan (Man of the Match winner), Ronan O'Driscoll and Mickey Lordan as well as scores from Kealan Hickey, Kieran Joyce, Ian Coughlan and Kieran O'Driscoll led the club to victory on a 0-11 to 0-09 scoreline.

In 2011 Ballincollig GAA Club won its first ever top grade Minor Football County Championship by defeating Douglas after a replay and added time in the CIT sports complex. Added to this was the Intermediate hurlers winning the Liam Breathnach Cup, the Senior footballers winning the Tadgh Crowley Cup and Junior footballers winning a Mid Cork Championship to cap off the most successful year in a long time for the Senior section of the Club.

Honours
 Cork Senior Football Championship Winners (1) 2014, Runners-Up 2016
 Cork Senior Hurling Championship Runners-Up 1941, 1942, 1943
 Cork Intermediate Hurling Championship Winners (8) 1912, 1929, 1934, 1935, 1939, 1967, 1999, 2018 Runners-Up 1940, 1995
 Cork Intermediate Football Championship Winners (1) 1994 Runners-Up 1988, 1991, 1993
 Cork Junior Hurling Championship Winners (2) 1927, 1963 Runners-Up 1987, 1990
 Cork Junior Football Championship Winners (3) 1933, 1940, 1981 Runners-Up 1930
 Cork Minor Hurling Championship Runners-Up 1991, 1993
 Cork Premier 2 Minor Hurling Championship Winners 2012 
 Cork Minor Football Championship Winners (1) 2011 Runners-Up 1998, 1999, 2002, 2006
 Cork Minor A Hurling Championship Winners (1) 2003
 Cork Under-21 Hurling Championship Winners (1) 1996 Runners-Up 1995
 Cork Under-21 Football Championship Winners (1)  2009 Runners-Up 1996, 2010, 2014
 Mid Cork Junior A Hurling Championship Winners (5) 1927, 1932, 1963, 1987, 1990 Runners-Up 1942, 1959, 1960, 1962, 1986, 1991, 1994, 2003
 Mid Cork Junior A Football Championship Winners (12) 1927, 1930, 1933, 1936, 1937, 1938, 1940, 1964, 1966, 1972, 1977, 1981 Runners-Up 1929,1935, 1945, 1948, 1965, 1975, 1980
 Cork Senior Camogie Championship Runner-Up 2013
 Cork Senior B Camogie championship (1) 2009

Notable players
 Willie "Long Puck" Murphy
 John Miskella
 Paddy "Hitler" Healy
 Paddy Kelly
 Noel Galvin - Cork Senior Football

References

External links
Ballincollig GAA Club Official Site

Gaelic games clubs in County Cork
Hurling clubs in County Cork
Gaelic football clubs in County Cork